The St. John Mine is located in Potosi, Wisconsin. It was added to the National Register of Historic Places in 1979.

History
Once a natural cave, Native Americans mined lead out of the site before Wisconsin's "lead rush" in 1827. The first non-Native American work the mine was Willis St. John. The mine is privately owned and tours are no longer available.

References

Industrial buildings and structures on the National Register of Historic Places in Wisconsin
Lead mines in the United States
Geography of Grant County, Wisconsin
Native American history of Wisconsin
Mines in Wisconsin
Caves of Wisconsin
National Register of Historic Places in Grant County, Wisconsin